Unforgettable Favorites (also known as Memories) was a satellite driven format distributed by ABC Radio Networks (through The Walt Disney Company). Unforgettable Favorites was a middle-of-the-road station and featured music from The Carpenters, Neil Diamond, Carly Simon, James Taylor, The Bee Gees, The Beatles, Linda Ronstadt, The Beach Boys and many others.

History
ABC Radio launched this format in late 1998 known as "Memories"; its slogan and second branding was "Unforgettable Favorites". Many American radio stations began using this feed, including ABC owned & operated KMEO 96.7 FM (now Cumulus-owned KTCK-FM) in Flower Mound, Texas. Another station that used the "Memories / Unforgettable Favorites" audio feed was KMMZ 96.9 FM, "Memories 96.9", now KQOB, broadcasting to the Oklahoma City metropolitan area and the Enid, Oklahoma area. KMMZ dropped Unforgettable Favorites in November 2002 and became a country music station. 2003 through 2005 proved to be a decline of "Memories" as some stations switched formats.

In the Summer of 2006, "Unforgettable Favorites" was discontinued and then merged into the adult standards format "Timeless Classics" and used the new branding "Timeless Favorites" up until a year later when it rebranded itself as simply "Timeless"--about the same time Citadel Broadcasting took control of ABC Radio (Citadel Media since April 2009 and Cumulus Media Networks since September 2011). "Timeless" ended February 15, 2010.

The station's satellite position was taken by The Christmas Channel, a seasonal channel. Unforgettable Favorites was, prior to the merger, switched over to Christmas music during the holiday season each year until Cumulus Media's merger of CMN and Westwood One in 2014.

Sample Playlist Before 2006 Closure
"Sweet Caroline" - Neil Diamond
"It's Not Unusual" - Tom Jones
"I'm Sorry" - Brenda Lee
"Easy" - Commodores
"I Got You Babe" - Sonny & Cher
"My Sweet Lord" - George Harrison
"We've Only Just Begun" - The Carpenters
"Cathy's Clown" - The Everly Brothers
"Different Drum" - The Stone Poneys with Linda Ronstadt
"We'll Sing in the Sunshine" - Gale Garnett
"I Only Want To Be With You" - Dusty Springfield
"You Needed Me" - Anne Murray
"Hello Again (Neil Diamond song)" - Neil Diamond
"For the Good Times (song)" - Ray Price
"Everything Is Beautiful" - Ray Stevens
"When I Fall In Love" - Celine Dion and Clive Griffin
"You've Got a Friend" - James Taylor
"There's a Kind of Hush" - Herman's Hermits
"Piano Man" - Billy Joel
"This Diamond Ring" - Gary Lewis & the Playboys
"Reflections" - The Supremes
"Cherish" - The Association
"California Dreamin'" - The Mamas & the Papas
"Tell It Like It Is" - Aaron Neville

Defunct radio networks in the United States
ABC Radio Networks
Former subsidiaries of The Walt Disney Company
Radio stations established in 1998 
Radio stations disestablished in 2006
Defunct radio stations in the United States